The 1989–90 Asian Club Championship was the 9th edition of the annual Asian club football competition hosted by Asian Football Confederation.

Liaoning FC of China won the final and became Asian champions for the first time.

Qualifying Tournament

Group 1

Played in Amman, Jordan

Group 2
Also for Gulf Cooperation Council Club Tournament – in Bahrain

All matches were played in Bahrain

'''Playoff for first place Asian Cup Group

Group 3

Played in Muscat, Oman

Group 4

Played in Ahvaz, Iran

Group 5

Played in Kuala Lumpur, Malaysia

Group 6

Played in Shenyang, China

Group stage
Al Deffatain, Muharraq Club and Al Arabi all withdrew

Group A

Played in Kuala Lumpur, Malaysia

Group B

Played in Jakarta, Indonesia

Final

References
Asian Club Competitions 1990 at RSSSF.com

1989 in Asian football
1990 in Asian football
1989–90